is a Japanese football player. She plays for Omiya Ardija Ventus. She played for Japan national team.

Club career
Norimatsu was born in Ageo on January 30, 1996. After graduating from JFA Academy Fukushima, she joined Urawa Reds in 2014. She was selected Best Young Player awards and Best Eleven in 2014 season.

National team career
In September 2012, Norimatsu was selected Japan U-17 national team for 2012 U-17 World Cup. On May 8, 2014, when Norimatsu was 18 years old, she debuted for Japan national team against New Zealand.  She played for Japan at 2014 Asian Cup and Japan won the championship. In 2016, she played as captain for U-20 team at 2016 U-20 World Cup and Japan won 3rd place.

National team statistics

References

External links

1996 births
Living people
Association football people from Saitama Prefecture
Japanese women's footballers
Japan women's international footballers
Nadeshiko League players
Urawa Red Diamonds Ladies players
People from Ageo, Saitama
Women's association football defenders